JOCX-DTV (channel 8), branded as  and colloquially known as CX, is a Japanese television station based in Odaiba, Minato, Tokyo, Japan. Owned and operated by the  it is the key station of the Fuji News Network (FNN) and the Fuji Network System (FNS). It is also known for its long-time slogan, "If it's not fun, it's not TV!"

Fuji Television also operates three premium television stations, known as "Fuji TV One" ("Fuji TV 739"—sports/variety, including all Tokyo Yakult Swallows home games), "Fuji TV Two" ("Fuji TV 721"—drama/anime), and "Fuji TV Next" ("Fuji TV CSHD"—live premium shows) (called together as "Fuji TV OneTwoNext"), all available in high-definition.

The current Fuji Television was established in October 2008. Fuji Media Holdings is the former Fuji Television founded in 1957.

Offices
The headquarters are located at 2-4-8, Daiba, Minato, Tokyo. The Kansai office is found at Aqua Dojima East, Dojima, Kita-ku, Osaka. The Nagoya office is found at Telepia, Higashi-sakura, Higashi-ku, Nagoya. The Japanese television station also has 12 bureau offices in other parts of the world in locations in countries such as France, Russia, USA, South Korea, China, Thailand and the UK.

History
Fuji Television Network Inc. was founded in 1957 by Nobutaka Shikanai and Shigeo Mizuno, presidents of Nippon Broadcasting System and Nippon Cultural Broadcasting respectively.  It started broadcasting in March 1959. In June of that year, Fuji TV formed a network with Tokai TV, Kansai TV, and KBC Television. In October 1966, Fuji launched FNN (Fuji News Network), the third national TV network, with Fuji-produced national news programming being aired to the network's affiliates in regional Japan.

On April 1, 1986, Fuji TV changed their corporate logo from the old "Channel 8" logo, to the "Medama" logo used by the Fujisankei Communications Group. In 1986 and 1987, Fuji TV worked with Nintendo to create two games called All Night Nippon Super Mario Bros. and Yume Kojo: Doki Doki Panic for the Famicom. All Night Nippon Super Mario Bros. was a retooled version of Super Mario Bros. with some minor changes, such as normal levels being replaced with levels from Super Mario Bros.: The Lost Levels and some enemies being replaced with Japanese celebrities with comedic effect. Yume Kojo: Doki Doki Panic later became the basis for Super Mario Bros. 2, which was subsequently released a year later.

In October 1987, Fuji TV began branding their late-night/early-morning slots collectively as JOCX-TV2 (meaning "alternative JOCX-TV") in an effort to market the traditionally unprofitable time slots and give opportunities to young creators to express their new ideas. JOCX-TV2 featured numerous experimental programs on low budgets under this and follow-on brands, a notable example being Zuiikin' English which first aired in spring 1992. The JOCX-TV2 branding itself was changed in October 1989 to JOCX-TV+, which lasted until September 1991, when it was replaced with GARDEN/JOCX-MIDNIGHT in October 1991. Meanwhile, Fuji TV helped produce only the third series of the British children's television programme Thomas the Tank Engine & Friends (now called Thomas & Friends) with its creator and producer Britt Allcroft. The GARDEN/JOCX-MIDNIGHT branding lasted until September 1992 when it was replaced with the JUNGLE branding, which lasted from October 1992 to September 1993. The JOCX-MIDNIGHT branding was introduced in October 1993 to replace the previous JUNGLE branding, and lasted until March 1996 when Fuji TV decided to stop branding their late-night/early-morning slots.

On March 10, 1997, Fuji TV moved from their old headquarters in Kawadacho, Shinjuku, into a new building in Odaiba, Minato, designed by Kenzo Tange.

Since 2002, Fuji TV has co-sponsored the Clarion Girl contest, held annually to select a representative for Clarion who will represent Clarion's car audio products in television and print advertising campaigns during the following year.

On April 1, 2006, Fuji TV split up the radio broadcasting and station license of Nippon Broadcasting System into a newly established company with the same name. The remaining of the old Nippon Broadcasting System was dissolved into Fuji TV. This resulted in the assets of  Nippon Broadcasting System being transferred over to Fuji TV.

On October 1, 2008, Fuji TV became a certified broadcasting holding company  and newly founded "Fuji Television Network Inc." took over the broadcasting business.

Fuji TV, which broadcasts Formula One in Japan since 1987, is the only media sponsor of a Formula One Grand Prix in the world. Fuji TV has also licensed numerous Formula One video games including Human Grand Prix IV: F1 Dream Battle.

Coverage

Current

Broadcasting rights

Football

Soccer 
 FIFA
 National teams
 Men's :
 FIFA World Cup (including qualifiers for Europe (all matches) and Asia (selected matches)
JFA
 Japan national football team (World Cup and all Asian Cup qualifiers from first round, with exclusive coverage for all friendlies)
 Japan national under-23 football team
 Kirin Cup Soccer
EAFF
 EAFF E-1 Football Championship
AFF–EAFF
 AFF–EAFF Champions Trophy
 Women's :
 FIFA Women's World Cup
 Japan women's national football team (World Cup and Asian Cup all qualifiers from first round, with exclusive coverage for all friendlies)
 Japan women's national under-23 football team
 EAFF E-1 Football Championship (women)

Figure Skating 
 World Figure Skating Championships

Baseball 
 Nippon Professional Baseball

Volleyball 
 FIVB Volleyball Men's World Cup
 FIVB Volleyball Women's World Cup

Boxing 
 K-1

Judo 
 World Judo Championships

Horse-racing 
 Japan Cup

Multi-sport events 
 Summer Olympic Games
 Winter Olympic Games
 Asian Games

Former

Basketball 
FIBA
 FIBA World Cup

Golf 
 Fujisankei Classic

Mixed martial arts 
 Rizin Fighting Federation

Motorsport 
 Formula One

Volleyball 
 FIVB Volleyball World League

TV broadcasting

Analog
as of July 24, 2011, end date
JOCX-TV - 
Tokyo Tower - Channel 8

Digital
JOCX-DTV - 
Remote controller button 8
Tokyo Skytree - Channel 21

Branch stations
Tokyo bottom
Hachioji (analog) - Channel 31
Tama (analog) - Channel 55
Islands in Tokyo
Chichijima (analog) - Channel 57
Hahajima (analog) - Channel 58
Niijima (analog) - Channel 58
Ibaraki Prefecture
Mito (analog) - Channel 38
Mito (digital) - Channel 19
Hitachi (analog) - Channel 58
Hitachi (digital) - Channel 19
Tochigi Prefecture
Utsunomiya (analog) - Channel 57
Utsunomiya (digital) - Channel 35
Gunma Prefecture
Maebashi (analog) - Channel 58
Maebashi (digital) - Channel 42
Saitama Prefecture
Chichibu (analog) - Channel 29
Chichibu (digital) - Channel 21
Chiba Prefecture
Narita (analog) - Channel 57
Tateyama (analog) - Channel 58
Choshi (analog) - Channel 57
Choshi (digital) - Channel 21
Kanagawa Prefecture
Yokosuka-Kurihama (analog) - Channel 37
Hiratsuka (analog) - Channel 39
Hiratsuka (digital) - Channel 21
Odawara (analog) - Channel 58
Odawara (digital) - Channel 21
Okinawa Prefecture
Kita-Daito (analog) - Channel 46
Minami-Daito (analog) - Channel 58

Overseas
U.S. (leased access, selected programs)
San Francisco, California KTSF  - Channel 26
New York WMBC-TV - Channel 63
Honolulu, Hawaii - Nippon Golden Network

Networks

Headquartered in Osaka, broadcast in the Kansai area: Kansai TV, Analog Channel 8, Digital Channel 17 [ID: 8]
Headquartered in Nagoya, broadcast in the Chukyo area: Tokai TV, Analog Channel 1, Digital Channel 21 [ID: 1]
Headquartered in Sapporo, broadcast in Hokkaidō: Hokkaido Cultural Broadcasting, Analog Channel 27, Digital Channel 25 [ID: 8]
Headquartered in Nagano, broadcast in Nagano Prefecture: Nagano Broadcasting Systems, Analog Channel 38, Digital Channel 15 [ID: 8]
Headquartered in Fukuoka, broadcast in Fukuoka Prefecture: Television Nishinippon Corporation, Analog Channel 9, Digital Channel 34 [ID: 8]
Headquartered in Naha, broadcast in Okinawa Prefecture: Okinawa Television, Analog Channel 8, Digital Channel 15 [ID: 8]

Programming

Anime

Anohana: The Flower We Saw That Day
Girls Bravo
Moegaku 5
One Piece
Re:Stage Dream Days

Tokusatsu 
Mirrorman (1971–1972)
Toei Fushigi Comedy Series (1981–1993)
Megaloman (1979)
Robot Detective K (1973)

Dramas

Japanese 
 (1996)

 (1997)
 (1997)
With Love (1999)
Hero (2001)
 (2003–2004)
 (2003, 2004)
  (2003, 2004)
 (2005)
 (2005)
 (2005)
 (2005, Tuesday 9:00 PM)
 (2006, Tuesday 9:00 PM)
 (2006)
 (2006)
  (2007, Monday 9:00 PM)
  (2007)
  (2007)
  (2007, Monday 9:00 PM)
Zettai Kareshi (2008)
  (2008)
 (2008, Thursday 9:00 PM)
  (Winter 2008, Monday 9:00 PM)
 (Spring 2008, Monday 9:00 PM)
 (Summer 2008, Monday 9:00 PM)
 (Autumn 2008, Monday 9:00 PM)
BOSS (2009, Thursday 9:00 PM)
 (Winter 2009, Monday 9:00 PM)
 (Spring 2009, Monday 9:00 PM)
Buzzer Beat  (Summer 2009, Monday 9:00 PM)
 (Autumn 2009, Monday 9:00 PM)
 (Autumn 2012, Monday 9:00 PM)
 (Winter 2013, Monday 9:00 PM)
 (Spring 2013, Monday 9:00 PM)
 (Summer 2013, Monday 9:00 PM)
Fight! Bookstore Girl (戦う！書店ガール, Spring 2015)
Good Morning Call  (autumn 2016) on  Netflix and Fuji TV

Korean 
Since 2010, Fuji TV started airing Korean dramas on its  block programming.

Cookery
Iron Chef (1993–1999, 2001 Special)

News and information
 - Morning news program.
 - Morning news program.
 - Morning news program.
 - Morning news program.
 - Morning news program.
 - Morning news program.
 - Morning news program.
FNN World Uplink (April 1991 - March 1993) - Morning news program.
 - Morning news program.
 - Morning news program.
 - Morning news program.
 - Morning news program.
 - Morning news program.
 - Morning news program.
Live News days (April 2019 – present) - News program before noon.
 - News program before noon.
 - News program before noon.
 - News program before noon.
 - News program before noon.
 - News program before noon.
Prime News Days (April 2018 - March 2019) - News program before noon.
Live News it! (April 2019 – present) - Evening news program.
 - Evening news program.
 - Evening news program.
 - Evening news program.
 - Evening news program.
 - Evening news program.
 - Evening news program.
 - Evening news program.
 - Evening news program.
Live News α (April 2019 – present) - Night news program.
 - Night news program.
 - Night news program.
 - Night news program.
 - Night news program.
 - Night news program.
 - Night news program.
FNN Date Line (October 1987 - March 1990) - Night news program.
FNN Newscom (April 1990 - March 1994) - Night news program.
 - Night news program.
 - Night news program.
 - Night news program.
The News α (October 2017 - March 2018) - Night news program.
Prime News α (April 2018 - March 2019) - Night news program.
Kids News - Weekly children's news program

Variety shows
 - end
 (Spike TV produced an American version of Hey! Spring of Trivia.)
The Gaman
Flyer TV
Zuiikin' English
Mecha-Mecha Iketeru!
 (October 1982 - March 2014)
Hey! Hey! Hey! Music Champ (October 1994 - December 2012)
Domoto Kuyodai (ended)
Music Fair
FNS Music Festival
Idoling!!!
a-nation 2012
 (December 31, 1996 -)

Reality television
 – Dating program that takes place on a pink van traveling the world.
 VivaVivaV6 (April 2001–present)
Magic Revolution (2004–present)
Game Center CX (2003–present)

Game shows
Brain Wall (Hole in the Wall in United States)
Quiz $ Millionaire (Japanese version of Who Wants to be a Millionaire?; April 2000-March 2007, New Year's Special 2013)
Vs. Arashi (April 2008 – 2020)
The Weakest Link (April–September 2002)
Bruce Forsyth's Play Your Cards Right (1980-2003)
VS Damashii (VS魂) (2021-)

Foreign
Chuggington
Pororo the Little Penguin
Thomas & Friends

Controversies
On August 7–21, 2011, more than 2,000 protesters from Japanese Culture Channel Sakura and other groups rallied in front of Fuji Television and Fuji Media Holdings' headquarters in Odaiba, Tokyo to demonstrate against what they perceived as the network's increased use of South Korean content, information manipulation and insulting treatment of Japanese people. Channel Sakura called Fuji TV the "Traitor Network" in these protests.

Further on June 29, 2015, Fuji TV apologized for running subtitles during a show earlier in the month that inaccurately described South Koreans interviewed on the street as saying they “hate” Japan. The apology came after a successful online petition over the weekend, with people stating the major broadcaster had fabricated the subtitles to breed Anti-Korean sentiment amongst the Japanese public. Fuji TV explained that both interviewees indeed spoke of their dislike of Japan during the interviews, but it accidentally ran clips that didn't contain that message. According to the broadcaster, “we aired these inaccurate clips because of a mix-up during the editing process as well as our failure to check the final footage sufficiently.”

See also 

Fujisankei Communications Group
 Television in Japan
 Hobankyo – Organization based in Japan that enforces Fuji Television copyright issues.

Notes

References

External links

Fuji Media Holdings, Inc. Official Site
Fuji TV Official Site
Fuji TV OneTwoNext

  Wiki collection of bibliographic works on Fuji Television
 Fuji TV Anime News Network 

Television stations in Japan
Japanese-language television stations
Television networks in Japan
Mass media companies established in 1957
Television channels and stations established in 1959
Television in Tokyo
Anime companies
Mass media companies based in Tokyo
Fuji News Network
Fuji TV
Fujisankei Communications Group
1957 establishments in Japan
Odaiba